Dilofo is a small mountain village located in western Kozani regional unit, in West Macedonia, Greece. It is part of the municipal unit Pentalofos.

Attractions
 Church of the Koimesis (Dormition) of the Virgin

References

External links
 Photos, dairy products factory in Dilofo

Populated places in Kozani (regional unit)